Penang Football Association, simply known as Penang FC or Penang, is a football team based in George Town, Penang.
Penang plays in the Malaysian football representing the state of Penang, Malaysia. They are currently play in the Malaysia Super League. Their home stadium is  City Stadium (Malay:Stadium Bandaraya). This stadium is famed for its vociferous home support dubbed the "Keramat Roar".  The team has won 15 major trophies in Malaysian football. Domestically they have won 3 Malaysia Super League titles, 4 Malaysia Cup, 1 Malaysia FA Cup, 1 Malaysia Charity Shield, 1 Malaysia Premier League and 5 Malaysia FAM League. They also had won Aga Khan Gold Cup in 1976.

Domestic Achievement

Malaysia Cup/HMS Malaya Cup
Winners (4): 1953, 1954, 1958, 1974
Runners-up (9): 1934, 1941, 1950, 1952, 1962, 1963, 1968, 1969, 1977
Malaysia Super League/First Division
Winners (3): *1982, 1998, 2001
Runners-up (3): 1983, 1999, 2000
Malaysia Premier League/Second Division
Winners (1): 2020
Runners-up (1): 1992, 2015
Malaysia FAM League/Third Division
Winners (5): *1952,1955,1956,1957, 2013
Runners-up (3): 1961,1962,1968
Malaysia FA Cup
Winners (1): 2002
Runners-up (2): 1997, 2000
Malaysia Charity Shield
Winners (1): 2003
Runners-up (0):

(*inaugural winners)

Other Domestic Achievements
Malaysia King's Gold Cup
Winners (9):  1951,1956,1966,1968,1969,1986,1998,2002, 2017
Runners-up (12): 1947,1950,1955,1958,1960,1962,1964,1965,1975,1983,1993,2008
Malaysia Agong Cup
Winners (2): 1998,2002
Runners-up (4): 1983,1999,2000,2001

Preseason Achievements

Penang TYT Cup
Winners (1): 2022
Hope Cup
Winners (1): 2023

Youth Achievement
Malaysia President Cup
Winners (1): 2004
Runners-up (1): 2015

Achievement In AFC
 AFC Champions League
Winners (0):
Runners-up (0):
 AFC Cup
Winners (0):
Runners-up (0):

Other Achievement In Asian

Aga Khan Gold Cup
Winners (1): 1976
Runners-up (0):

Notes

See also
Penang FC

References

External links
List of Piala Emas Raja-Raja and Agong Cup Winners

Football clubs in Malaysia